Alfred Browne (born 1 July 1959) is an Antigua and Barbuda sprinter. He competed in the 400 metres at the 1984 Summer Olympics and the 1988 Summer Olympics.

References

1959 births
Living people
Athletes (track and field) at the 1983 Pan American Games
Athletes (track and field) at the 1984 Summer Olympics
Athletes (track and field) at the 1988 Summer Olympics
Antigua and Barbuda male sprinters
Olympic athletes of Antigua and Barbuda
Place of birth missing (living people)
Pan American Games competitors for Antigua and Barbuda